SNMPTT is an SNMP trap handler written in Perl for use with the NET-SNMP/UCD-SNMP snmptrapd program. Received traps are translated into user friendly messages using variable substitution. Output can be to STDOUT, text log file, syslog, NT Event Log, MySQL (Linux/Windows), PostgreSQL, or an ODBC database. User defined programs can also be executed.

Distribution

SNMPTT can be downloaded from the SourceForge project page or the project web page.

Books

Information on SNMPTT is available in the following books:

 Turnbull, James; (2006) Pro Nagios 2.0 - San Francisco: Apress 
 Schubert, Max et al.; (2008) Nagios 3 Enterprise Network Monitoring - Syngress 
 Barth, Wolfgang; (2008) "Nagios: System And Network Monitoring, 2nd edition'' - No Starch Press 

Internet Protocol based network software
Free network management software
Multi-agent network management software
Network analyzers
Nagios